This is a list of notable science fiction conventions, as distinct from anime conventions, comic book conventions, furry conventions, gaming conventions, horror conventions, and multigenre conventions.

In the "type" column, "general" means the entire science fiction and fantasy culture; "literature", "media", etc. modify that. Horror is indicated separately.